Birger Lensander (21 October 1908 – 3 March 1971) was a Swedish actor. He appeared in more than 70 films and television shows between 1943 and 1969.

Selected filmography

 The Girls in Smaland (1945)
 Neglected by His Wife (1947)
 Lars Hård (1948)
 Robinson in Roslagen (1948)
 Foreign Harbour (1948)
 The Quartet That Split Up (1950)
 She Came Like the Wind (1952)
 Ursula, the Girl from the Finnish Forests (1953)
 The Road to Klockrike (1953)
 House of Women (1953)
 Dance, My Doll (1953)
 Café Lunchrasten (1954)
 Our Father and the Gypsy (1954)
 People of the Finnish Forests (1955)
 Voyage in the Night (1955)
 A Little Nest (1956)
 The Song of the Scarlet Flower (1956)
 The Stranger from the Sky (1956)
 Seventeen Years Old (1957)
 Synnöve Solbakken (1957)
 Bill Bergson Lives Dangerously (1957)
 Laila (1958)
 We at Väddö (1958)
 Fridolf Stands Up! (1958)
 Heart's Desire (1960)
 The Mistress (1962)
 Nightmare (1965)
 Ön (1966)
 Woman of Darkness (1966)
 Here's Your Life (1966)

References

External links

1908 births
1971 deaths
20th-century Swedish male actors
Swedish male film actors
Swedish male television actors
Male actors from Stockholm